Aleksandra Martha Justine Bechtel (born October 1, 1972) is a Finnish-German TV-presenter and personality. In 1993, she started working for the new TV channel VIVA Germany as a VJ. Bechtel, in 1996, starred with Matthias Opdenhövel in the TV-show Bitte lächeln on RTL II for two years.

She is married to Alexander Lassen. The couple has two sons.

References

External links

1972 births
German television journalists
Living people
German women television journalists
German television presenters
German women television presenters
RTL Group people